Destroy All Music is the second album by The Flying Luttenbachers, released in 1995 through ugEXPLODE.

Track listing

Personnel 
The Flying Luttenbachers
Jeb Bishop – bass guitar, trombone, Casio MT-65
Chad Organ – tenor saxophone, baritone saxophone, Moog synthesizer
Dylan Posa – guitar
Weasel Walter – drums
Ken Vandermark – tenor saxophone, soprano clarinet, bass clarinet
Production and additional personnel
Elliot Dicks – recording on "Tiamat en Arc"
Carolyn Faber – photography
The Flying Luttenbachers – production
Jim O'Rourke – synthesizer on "Eaten by Sharks"
Chuck Uchida – recording

References

External links 
 

1995 albums
The Flying Luttenbachers albums